Lend Me Your Voice is a 2021 Rwandan documentary short film directed by Claudine Ndimbira. The film was screened as a world premiere on 7 May 2022 in the African Encounters category at the Internationales Dokumentarfilmfestival München (DOK.fest München) and was just one of two films from Generation Africa project to be premiered at the 2022 DOK.fest Munich wih the other being Home Again. The film was also screened at the Sheffield DocFest in June 2022. The film was also aired on Arte.

Synopsis 
Akili Nadege, Congolese woman lived as a refugee in Burundi as she never had the opportunity of growing up in her native Democratic Republic of the Congo due to the cruel civil war which even took away the life of her own father. She realises her family has been displaced and separated and she herself has been at the receiving end as she was held and tortured in prison during her time as refugee in Burundi and even falls at risk of death. She somehow escapes from Burundi and moves to Rwanda in search of glimmer of hope. She gives a spirited fightback against the misogyny and rises up to the occasion.

Production 
The film was produced by Generation Africa in collaboration with Deutsche Welle Akademie, Robert Bosch Stiftung, Social Transformation and Empowerment Projects (STEPS), Bertha Foundation, German Federal Ministry for Economic Cooperation and Development and German Cooperation. The film was one of the 25 films which was selected for the Generation Africa project.

References 

Rwandan short documentary films
2022 films
2022 short documentary films
2020s English-language films
2020s French-language films
2022 multilingual films